Marhemetabad Districtis a former administrative division of Miandoab County, West Azerbaijan province, Iran. At the 2006 National Census, its population was 23,700 in 5,718 households. The following census in 2011 counted 25,814 people in 7,135 households. At the latest census in 2016, the district had 26,219 inhabitants in 7,797 households. The district was separated from the county, raised to the status of Chaharborj County, and divided into two districts in 2020.

References 

Miandoab County

Districts of West Azerbaijan Province

Populated places in West Azerbaijan Province

Populated places in Miandoab County